The Church of Saint Thomas is a Syriac Orthodox church in Mosul, Iraq.

History
The church is dedicated to Saint Thomas the Apostle and is believed to have been constructed on the site of the house that the saint resided in during his stay in Mosul. The church is first mentioned in 770 as part of a grievance to Caliph Al-Mahdi. The current structure suggests it was built in the 13th century. The church was damaged during Shahanshah Nader Shah's siege of Mosul as part of the Ottoman–Persian War of 1743–1746, and was subsequently renovated in 1744 by Cyril George, metropolitan bishop of Hattakh, with the permission of the Ottoman Sultan Mahmud I. It was later renovated again in 1848.

Amidst restoration work in 1964, the finger bones of Saint Thomas were discovered in the church. On 23 December 2009, a bomb damaged the church, killed two men and injured five people. In the aftermath of the Fall of Mosul, the relics of Saint Thomas were taken from the church by Nicodemus Daoud Sharaf, Syriac Orthodox Archbishop of Mosul, and transferred to the Monastery of Saint Matthew on 17 June 2014. The church was used as a prison by Islamic State insurgents until the city's liberation in 2017.

Burials
Ignatius Isaac II, Syriac Orthodox patriarch of Antioch
Basil Matthew II, Syriac Orthodox maphrian of the East
Basil Lazarus IV, Syriac Orthodox maphrian of the East
Cyril Rizq Allah, Syriac Orthodox metropolitan bishop of Mosul
Cyril 'Abd al-'Aziz, Syriac Orthodox metropolitan bishop of Mosul

References

Bibliography

Churches in Mosul
Syriac Orthodox churches in Iraq
Persecution of Assyrians by ISIL
Islamist attacks on churches